Nasi goreng pattaya, or simply nasi pattaya, is a Southeast Asian fried rice dish made by covering or wrapping chicken fried rice, in thin fried egg or omelette. Despite its apparent reference to the city of Pattaya in Thailand, the dish is believed to originate from Malaysia, and today is also commonly found in Indonesia and Singapore. It is often served with chili sauce, tomato ketchup, slices of cucumber, and keropok.

In Indonesia this kind of nasi goreng is often called nasi goreng amplop (enveloped fried rice), since the nasi goreng is enveloped within a pocket of thin omelette. However, due to proximity and neighbouring influences, today this kind of fried rice is often also called as nasi goreng pattaya in Indonesia. Today, the dish is popular throughout Southeast Asia, it is one of the fried rice variants favourite in Malaysia, Indonesia and Singapore.

Etymology and origin 
The name is believed to be derived from Pattaya, a popular beach resort in Thailand. However, despite its Thai-sounding name, the dish is actually more common in Malaysia than in Thailand. The omelette-covered pattaya fried rice is hardly found in Pattaya itself. It is most likely that the dish did originate in Malaysia, and that the "Pattaya" moniker was probably used for novelty or marketing purposes.

Similar dish 
A similar dish exists in Japan, and is called omuraisu (from the English words omelette/omuretsu and rice). It is a fried ketchup-flavoured rice sandwiched with a thinly spread beaten egg or covered with a plain egg omelette.

See also 

 Fried egg
 Omurice
 Malay cuisine
 List of fried rice dishes
 Malaysian cuisine

Further reading

References

External links 
 

Fried rice
Malay words and phrases
Malaysian rice dishes
Indonesian rice dishes
Omelettes
Chicken and rice dishes
Stuffed dishes